Year One or Year 1 may refer to:

 1 AD, a year
 1 BC, a year
 Year One in political history, after a radical change or revolution
 Year 1 (education), an educational year group in schools
 Year One (film), a 2009 American adventure comedy
 Anno uno, a 1974 Italian biographical film released internationally as Year One
 Batman: Year One, a DC Comics story arc 
 Batman: Year One (film), a 2011 animated film based on the story arc
 Robin: Year One, another DC Comics story arc
 Batgirl: Year One, a 2003 DC Comics comic book miniseries
 Two-Face: Year One, a 2008 DC Comics two-part miniseries
 Green Arrow: Year One, a 2007 DC Comics limited series
 Superman: Year One, a 2019 DC Comics limited series published under the DC Black Label
 Gotham City: Year One, a 2022 DC Comics limited series
 Ryan Caulfield: Year One, a 1999 American television series
 A Vampyre Story: Year One, an adventure game under development

See also 
 Year Zero (disambiguation)
 The Year Is One
 Lovers in the Year One
 One Year
 New Year (disambiguation)
 One (disambiguation)